In calculus, absolute continuity is a smoothness property of functions that is stronger than continuity and uniform continuity. The notion of absolute continuity allows one to obtain generalizations of the relationship between the two central operations of calculus—differentiation and integration. This relationship is commonly characterized (by the fundamental theorem of calculus) in the framework of Riemann integration, but with absolute continuity it may be formulated in terms of Lebesgue integration. For real-valued functions on the real line, two interrelated notions appear: absolute continuity of functions and absolute continuity of measures. These two notions are generalized in different directions. The usual derivative of a function is related to the Radon–Nikodym derivative, or density, of a measure.
We have the following chains of inclusions for functions over a compact subset of the real line:

 absolutely continuous ⊆ uniformly continuous  continuous

and, for a compact interval,

 continuously differentiable ⊆ Lipschitz continuous ⊆ absolutely continuous ⊆ bounded variation  ⊆ differentiable almost everywhere.

Absolute continuity of functions

But a continuous function f can fail to be absolutely continuous even on a compact interval. It may not be "differentiable almost everywhere" (like the Weierstrass function, which is not differentiable anywhere). Or it may be differentiable almost everywhere and its derivative f ′ may be Lebesgue integrable, but the integral of f ′ differs from the increment of f (how much f changes over an interval). This happens for example with the Cantor function.

Definition
Let  be an interval in the real line .

then

Equivalent definitions

The following conditions on a real-valued function f on a compact interval [a,b] are equivalent:

 f is absolutely continuous;
 there exists a Lebesgue integrable function g on [a,b] such that  for all x in [a,b].

If these equivalent conditions are satisfied then necessarily g = f ′ almost everywhere.

Equivalence between (1) and (3) is known as the fundamental theorem of Lebesgue integral calculus, due to Lebesgue.

For an equivalent definition in terms of measures see the section Relation between the two notions of absolute continuity.

Properties
 The sum and difference of two absolutely continuous functions are also absolutely continuous. If the two functions are defined on a bounded closed interval, then their product is also absolutely continuous.
 If an absolutely continuous function is defined on a bounded closed interval and is nowhere zero then its reciprocal is absolutely continuous.
 Every absolutely continuous function (over a compact interval) is uniformly continuous and, therefore, continuous. Every (globally) Lipschitz-continuous function is absolutely continuous.
 If f: [a,b] → R is absolutely continuous, then it is of bounded variation on [a,b].
  If f: [a,b] → R is absolutely continuous, then it can be written as the difference of two monotonic nondecreasing absolutely continuous functions on [a,b].
 If f: [a,b] → R is absolutely continuous, then it has the Luzin N property (that is, for any  such that , it holds that , where  stands for the Lebesgue measure on R).
 f: I → R is absolutely continuous if and only if it is continuous, is of bounded variation and has the Luzin N property. This statement is also known as the Banach-Zareckiǐ theorem.
 If f: I → R is absolutely continuous and g: R → R is globally Lipschitz-continuous, then the composition g ∘ f is absolutely continuous. Conversely, for every function g that is not globally Lipschitz continuous there exists an absolutely continuous function f such that g ∘ f is not absolutely continuous.

Examples
The following functions are uniformly continuous but not absolutely continuous:
 the Cantor function on [0, 1] (it is of bounded variation but not absolutely continuous);
 the function  on a finite interval containing the origin.

The following functions are absolutely continuous but not α-Hölder continuous:
 the function f(x) = xβ on [0, c], for any 

The following functions are absolutely continuous and α-Hölder continuous but not Lipschitz continuous:
 the function f(x) =  on [0, c], for α ≤ 1/2.

Generalizations
Let (X, d) be a metric space and let I be an interval in the real line R. A function f: I → X is absolutely continuous on I if for every positive number , there is a positive number  such that whenever a finite sequence of pairwise disjoint sub-intervals [xk, yk] of I satisfies

then

The collection of all absolutely continuous functions from I into X is denoted AC(I; X).

A further generalization is the space ACp(I; X) of curves f: I → X such that

for some m in the Lp space Lp(I).

Properties of these generalizations
 Every absolutely continuous function (over a compact interval) is uniformly continuous and, therefore, continuous. Every Lipschitz-continuous function is absolutely continuous.
 If f: [a,b] → X is absolutely continuous, then it is of bounded variation on [a,b].
 For f ∈ ACp(I; X), the metric derivative of f exists for λ-almost all times in I, and the metric derivative is the smallest m ∈ Lp(I; R) such that

Absolute continuity of measures

Definition
A measure  on Borel subsets of the real line is absolutely continuous with respect to the Lebesgue measure  if for every -measurable set   implies  This is written as  We say  is dominated by 

In most applications, if a measure on the real line is simply said to be absolutely continuous — without specifying with respect to which other measure it is absolutely continuous — then absolute continuity with respect to the Lebesgue measure is meant.

The same principle holds for measures on Borel subsets of

Equivalent definitions
The following conditions on a finite measure  on Borel subsets of the real line are equivalent:

  is absolutely continuous;
 for every positive number  there is a positive number  such that  for all Borel sets  of Lebesgue measure less than 
 there exists a Lebesgue integrable function  on the real line such that  for all Borel subsets  of the real line.

For an equivalent definition in terms of functions see the section Relation between the two notions of absolute continuity.

Any other function satisfying (3) is equal to  almost everywhere. Such a function is called Radon–Nikodym derivative, or density, of the absolutely continuous measure 

Generalizations
That is:

When  then  is said to be  

Absolute continuity of measures is reflexive and transitive, but is not antisymmetric, so it is a preorder rather than a partial order. Thus absolute continuity induces a partial ordering of such equivalence classes.

Singular measures
Via Lebesgue's decomposition theorem, every σ-finite measure can be decomposed into the sum of an absolutely continuous measure and a singular measure with respect to another σ-finite measure. See singular measure for examples of measures that are not absolutely continuous.

Relation between the two notions of absolute continuity
A finite measure μ on Borel subsets of the real line is absolutely continuous with respect to Lebesgue measure if and only if the point function

is an absolutely continuous real function.
More generally, a function is locally (meaning on every bounded interval) absolutely continuous if and only if its distributional derivative is a measure that is absolutely continuous with respect to the Lebesgue measure.

If absolute continuity holds then the Radon–Nikodym derivative of μ is equal almost everywhere to the derivative of F.

In this case μ is the Lebesgue–Stieltjes measure generated by F.
The relation between the two notions of absolute continuity still holds.

Notes

References
 
 
 
 

External links
 Absolute continuity at Encyclopedia of Mathematics
 Topics in Real and Functional Analysis by Gerald Teschl

Theory of continuous functions
Real analysis
Measure theory